The 1960–61 season was Leicester City's 56th season in the Football League and their 18th (non-consecutive) season in the first tier of English football.

Season summary
Leicester finished in their highest league position since finishing league runners-up 34 years previously. The club also reached the FA Cup final for the second time, eventually losing to Tottenham Hotspur who completed the first double of the 20th century. Though most of the talk about the Leicester cup final side was about the lack of Ken Leek, who had been controversially dropped for his off-the-field antics despite scoring in every round of the club's run to the final.

Final league table

Results
Leicester City's score comes first

Legend

Football League First Division

FA Cup

League Cup

Squad

Club statistics
All data from: Dave Smith and Paul Taylor, Of Fossils and Foxes: The Official Definitive History of Leicester City Football Club (2001)

Top goalscorers

References

Leicester City F.C. seasons
Leicester City